Steve Bell, C.M.,O.M., (born November 17, 1960) is a Canadian singer/songwriter and guitarist based in Winnipeg, Manitoba, Canada. He is among the best-known Christian musicians in Canada and is an accomplished songwriter and record producer. Before embarking on his solo career he was a long-time member of the group Elias, Schritt and Bell. In 1989, Bell founded the independent recording label Signpost Music along with Dave Zeglinski, long-time friend and co-producer. His first solo album, Comfort My People, was released on Signpost that same year. Bell now has twenty albums to his credit. Among his many awards are two Junos, several GMA Canada Covenant Awards and the 2012 Queen Elizabeth II Diamond Jubilee Medal.

Musical career
Steve Bell has been performing music since childhood. His recording career began at 13 when his family's gospel band, The Alf Bell Family Singers, recorded an LP. The album contains some of his earliest songwriting. After graduating from high school he was a member of a succession of bands playing a number of different musical genres. For three years he played with the secular folk trio Elias, Schritt and Bell, along with Tim Elias and John Schritt. The group released one commercial studio album, Awakening, in 1982. Bell quit the band and performed with various artists (Rocki Rolletti, Rhonda Hart, Byron O'Donnell, Bob King) until 1988 when he withdrew from performing. It was during this period that his childhood Christian faith became reanimated and over a six-month period wrote most of the material for his first four solo projects. Faced with a lack of interest from established labels he formed the Indie record label Signpost Music in 1989 and released his first solo album. The first edition of Comfort My People comprised 300 Cassettes.

Bell has gone on to release twenty solo albums, selling over 400,000 copies independently. His tours have taken him all over North America and the world (2000+ concerts). In 1994 Signpost Music received a boost when Bell became business partners with his co-producer Dave Zeglinski. Bell was the Juno Awards' first winner in the Best Gospel Album category in 1998. That category was created from the former Blues/Gospel Album category, which represented the industry's recognition of Contemporary Christian Music in Canada.

Since then, Bell has gone on to release 20 albums, 4 concert DVDs, 5 songbooks, a co-authored book on the Psalms, and a 7-book series on the Christian calendar called Pilgrim Year. His work has earned him two JUNOs, four Western Canadian Music Awards, three Prairie Music Awards, eleven Gospel Music Association Covenant Awards (including Male Vocalist of the Year, Recorded Song of the Year, Album of the Year, and the 2018 Lifetime Achievement Award), and many more nominations. He has won three Word Awards for his poetry, song lyrics, and magazine articles. Bell's most recent feature-length album, Where the Good Way Lies (released on LP and DVD) included collaborations with local Indigenous singers Ray “Coco” Stevenson and Fresh I.E., was nominated for a 2017 JUNO Award for Contemporary Christian/Gospel Album of the Year.

In 2006 Bell was invited to perform with the Winnipeg Symphony Orchestra. Scores were created by jazz pianist and composer Mike Janzen. Since then, Bell has performed 30 sold-out or capacity-crowd concerts with symphonies across Canada and the United States. Bell's concert DVD, Steve Bell in Concert with the Edmonton Symphony Orchestra, won a 2009 International Christian Visual Media Gold Crown Award for Best Music Video. For his "skill, his musicality, for his connection with the symphony, and for his openness" Steve was awarded the Winnipeg Symphony Golden Baton Award in 2013.

In 2014, Bell was the subject of a documentary by Refuge31 Films entitled Burning Ember: The Steve Bell Journey, for which a film crew followed Steve across North America to chronicle the many ups and downs of life in the music industry. The documentary has won numerous awards and has been broadcast in Canada (CBC's Documentary Channel) and worldwide.

Advocacy
Amidst his regular touring schedule, Bell has worked on behalf of aid organizations such as World Vision, Compassion Canada, and the Canadian Foodgrains Bank. His advocacy efforts have helped raise awareness and significant financial support. A close association with the National Roundtable on Homelessness and Poverty has helped draw attention to the plight of Canada's marginalized. Having traveled extensively in the Third World, Bell spreads hope via his music and message to communities in India, Thailand, Bangladesh, the Philippines, Ethiopia, Palestine, Kenya, Guatemala, and many other countries.

In recent years, Bell has used his platform to advocate for the building of Freedom Road, a 27-kilometre road that ended a century of isolation for the people of Shoal Lake 40 First Nation. He has also been a strong voice urging the Canadian government to adopt Bill C-262, an act that would ensure that Canadian laws are in harmony with the United Nations Declaration on the Rights of Indigenous Peoples. Bell's "effort for the sake of Indigenous communities" which has "brought together many Indigenous, church, political and other groups of people, including students," was a major impetus for Canadian Mennonite University's selection of him as their 2018 CMU PAX Award recipient. Crandall University also presented Bell with their 2017 Leadership Award "for an extraordinary career of sustained artistic excellence, spiritual vitality, and open-handed generosity to others."

Works

Discography

Bibliography 
I Will Not Be Shaken: A Songwriter's Journey Through the Psalms (co-written with Jamie Howison), published by Signpost, 2015
Pilgrim Year (Seven-volume boxset), published by  Novalis, 2018

Videos 
Steve Bell — In Concert, at Home, and With Friends (1996)
Steve Bell Band In Concert (1999)
Steve Bell in Concert with The Edmonton Symphony Orchestra (2007, review)
Steve Bell & Malcolm Guite — Live at the West End: An Evening of Story, Song and Friendship (2013)

Songbooks
The Music of Steve Bell (1989–1995)
Romantics & Mystics (1997)
Simple Songs (2000)
Waiting for Aidan (2001)
Devotion (digital) (2008)

Audio magazines
 Blessings, volume 1
 Can God Be Trusted, volume 2

Collaborations
 Co-wrote "Tremble" with Glen Soderholm on his album By Faint Degrees (Pilgrim Gargoyle Recording, 2000)
 Co-wrote "These Are The Ones" with Glen Soderholm on his album This Bright Sadness (Signpost, 2008)
 "Everything We Need" (2009, video) (with Fresh I.E.)
"Where the Good Way Lies" (2016, song) (with Fresh I.E. and Ray "Coco" Stevenson)

Notable appearances
 Mandolin and vocals on Glen Soderholm's album In the Belly of the Fish (Pilgrim Gargoyle Recording, 1997)
 Background vocals on Glen Soderholm's By Faint Degrees (Pilgrim Gargoyle Recording, 2000)
 Mandolin and guitar on "It Has to Be You", on Carolyn Arends' album Travelers (Signpost, 2001)
 Duet on "Who You Are" on Carolyn Arends' album Under the Gaze (2B Records, 2004)
 Duet on "When I Survey The Wondrous Cross" with Lianna Klassen on her album Out of Borderland (Dawntreader Productions, 2004)
 Harmony vocals on "All Is Made Well" on Glen Soderholm's World Without End (Signpost, 2006)
 Background vocals on "Tonight I Am the Wind" with Kerri Woelke on her album Where We Were (Signpost, 2008)
 Background vocals on "Never Say Goodbye" on Carolyn Arends' album Love Was Here First (Signpost, 2009)
Harmony vocals on "Lord of All" on Jaylene Johnson's album Potter & Clay (Signpost, 2016)

Songs in other projects
 Window of Hope, "Here by the Water", "Burning Ember", "Ready My Heart" and "Psalm 32" (Gospel Music Foundation, 2002)
 Signpost Collections Vol. 1, "Ever Present Need", "Stay Awake" (Signpost, 2003)
 Sea to Sea: Filled With Your Glory, "Jesus My Glory" (CMC, 2004)
 Canadian Bible Society centennial CD: Good News Celebration, "Eventide" (CMC, 2006)
 GMA Canada presents 30th Anniversary Collection, "Deep Calls To Deep" (CMC, 2008)
 Sea to Sea: Christmas, "Coventry Carol" (Lakeside, 2009)
Am I Safe? Exploring Fear and Anxiety with Children by Tim Huff & Iona Snair, "A Heartbeat Away" (Castle Quay Books, 2019)

Awards and recognition
Note that years indicated represent award ceremony dates, not the years in which qualifying albums were released.

Gold Crown Award
 2009 Best Music Video: Steve Bell in Concert with the Edmonton Symphony Orchestra

Gospel Music Association of Canada Covenant Awards

 2002 Pop/Contemporary Album of the Year: Waiting for Aidan
2002 Song of the Year: "Eventide"
 2008 Producers of the Year (with Dave Zeglinski): Symphony Sessions
 2009 Jazz/Blues Song of the Year: "Embrace the Mystery"
2011 Folk/Roots Album of the Year (tie): Kindness
2015 Folk album of the Year: Pilgrimage 
2015 Album Artwork: Roberta Hanson/designer: Pilgrimage
2018 Lifetime Achievement Award
2018 Album of the Year: Where the Good Way Lies
2018 Collaboration of the Year (with Ray "Coco" Stevenson and Fresh I.E.): Where the Good Way Lies
2018 Inspirational Song of the Year: Wait Alone in Stillness
30 other nominations between 2001 - 2018

Juno Awards
 1998 Best Gospel Album: Romantics & Mystics
 2001 Best Gospel Album: Simple Songs
 2002 nominee, Best Gospel Album: Waiting for Aidan
 2010 nominee, Best Contemporary Christian/Gospel Album: Devotion
2015 Recording Package of the Year: Pilgrimage boxset designed by Roberta Hansen
2017 nominee, Contemporary Christian/Gospel Album of the Year: Where the Good Way Lies

Prairie Music Awards
 2001 Outstanding Christian Recording: Simple Songs
 2001 Outstanding Producer (with Dave Zeglinski): Simple Songs
 2002 Outstanding Christian Recording: Waiting For Aidan 

Shai/Vibe Awards
 2003 Male Vocalist of the Year
 2004 Artist of the Year
 2004 Male Soloist of the Year
 2005 nominee, Male Soloist of the Year

Western Canadian Music Awards
 2004 nominee, Outstanding Christian Recording (with Sarah Bell): Sons & Daughters
 2004 nominee, Outstanding Producer (with Dave Zeglinski): Sons & Daughters
 2008 Outstanding Contemporary Christian/Gospel Recording: Symphony Sessions
 2009 Contemporary Christian/Gospel Recording of the Year: Devotion
 2013 Spiritual Recording of the Year: Keening for the Dawn
 2015 nominee, Roots Album of the Year: Pilgrimage 
 2015 Album Design: Pilgrimage (Roberta Hanson / designer)

Word Awards

 2014 Terence L. Bingley Award for Best Song Lyrics: "Oracles"
 2015 Terence L. Bingley Award for Best Song Lyrics: "Long Love"
 2017 Word Award for Poetry: "Freedom Road" in Intotemak Magazine
 2017 nominee, Column – Single: "Red Brother Red Sister" in Mosaic Magazine
 2018 Word Award for Column – Single: "Success: The Art of Staying Closely Behind" in Seven Magazine
 2019 nominee (awards not yet announced) for Best Song Lyrics: "Wouldn't You Love to Know"
 2019 nominee (awards not yet announced) for Poetry: "The Name"

Other
 1999 Cantate Award Citation (St. Benedict’s Monastery)
 2008 Distinguished Christian Leadership Award / Providence College and Seminary
 2012 Queen Elizabeth II Diamond Jubilee Medal 
 2013 Winnipeg Symphony Orchestra Golden Baton Award for artistic achievement
 2017 Crandall University Leadership Award
 2018 CMU Pax Award
 2021 Member of the Order of Manitoba

See also
 Hugh Marsh (Collaborations)
 Music of Manitoba

References

External links
 
 
 
 

1960 births
Living people
Canadian male singer-songwriters
Canadian performers of Christian music
Musicians from Calgary
Juno Award for Contemporary Christian/Gospel Album of the Year winners
Members of the Order of Manitoba